Lacus Autumni (Latin autumnī, "Lake of Autumn") is a region of lunar mare that lies near the western limb of the Moon. Along this side of the lunar surface is a huge impact basin centered on the Mare Orientale. Two concentric mountain rings surround the Orientale mare, the inner ring being named Montes Rook and an outer ring called the Montes Cordillera. Lacus Autumni lies in the northeastern quadrant of the gap between these two mountain rings. This section of the lunar surface is difficult to observe directly from the Earth.

The irregular appearance results from the lunar basalt emerging from the surface to fill in low areas between hummocky hills.

The name of the feature was approved by the IAU in 1970.

References

External links
NASA lunar Atlas
 Lunar Orbiter Photo Number IV-181-H2

Autumni, Lacus